was a  after Jian and before Chōgen. This period spanned the years from July 1024 through July 1028.

Change of era
 1024 : The new era name was created to mark an event or series of events. The previous era ended and the new one commenced in Jian 4, on the 13th day of the 7th month of 1024.

Events of the Manju era
 1024 (Manju 1): Fujiwara no Kintō withdrew from his public duties; and he retired to Kitayama in the north of Kyoto. 
 May 4, 1026 (Manju 3, 15th day of the 4th month): a partial lunar eclipse. 
 1027 (Manju 4): Fujiwara no Michinaga died at age 62.

Notes

References
 Ackroyd, Joyce. (1982) Lessons from History: The Tokushi Yoron. Brisbane: University of Queensland Press. ; OCLC 7574544 
 Brown, Delmer M. and Ichirō Ishida, eds. (1979).  Gukanshō: The Future and the Past. Berkeley: University of California Press. ;  OCLC 251325323
 Iwao, Seiichi. (2002).  Dictionnaire historique du Japon (Vol. I),  (Vol. II)  (with Teizō Iyanaga, Susumu Ishii, Shōichirō Yoshida et al.). Paris: Maisonneuve & Larose. ;  OCLC 51096469
 Nussbaum, Louis-Frédéric and Käthe Roth. (2005).  Japan encyclopedia. Cambridge: Harvard University Press. ;  OCLC 58053128
 Titsingh, Isaac. (1834). Nihon Odai Ichiran; ou,  Annales des empereurs du Japon.  Paris: Royal Asiatic Society, Oriental Translation Fund of Great Britain and Ireland. OCLC 5850691
 Varley, H. Paul. (1980). A Chronicle of Gods and Sovereigns: Jinnō Shōtōki of Kitabatake Chikafusa. New York: Columbia University Press. ;  OCLC 6042764

External links
 National Diet Library, "The Japanese Calendar" -- historical overview plus illustrative images from library's collection

Japanese eras